Central High School is a multi-campus high school located in Fresno, California. The first campus is known as the West Campus, erected in 1922. The second campus, called the East Campus, opened its doors to students in August 1996. Central High serves grades 9-12 and is part of the Central Unified School District

Central Unified is currently constructing a new campus expected to open during the 2021-2022 school year. The new high school will be named after the late Central Football Coach Justin Garza. Justin Garza High School will be a separate school from Central High School in Central Unified. 
 On March 13, 2020, the school shutdown in response to the growing Coronavirus pandemic in the United States. As of December 2020, the school has yet to reopen. 

For the 2021-2022 school year, it has been announced that the two-campuses will split and become separate high schools. Central East and Justin Garza will be based on school boundaries while students will be able to choose to attend Central High School (formerly West campus)

History
On March 1, 1922, the Central Union High School District was formed. Newly elected board members from the elementary schools had met earlier that year with Walter G. Martin, who would become the new principal. A piece of property on the corner of McKinley Ave. and Dickenson Ave. was purchased from the Charles Mutchler family, which operated a 120-acre farm and dairy at that location. In October of that same year, Central Union High School opened for its first term in two temporary buildings. It had four teachers, including principal W.G. Martin, who taught history. Ward R. Miles taught plane geometry, general science, biology and physical education, Maude Starbuck taught algebra, Latin and English, and Darlene McAllister taught Spanish, English, and physical education. Student enrollment was 70 students. By the end of the first school year, enrollment was close to 100 students. By 1923, construction of a permanent building began. It was considered to be the largest high school in California. It was a two-story brick and stucco building, containing approximately 20 classrooms, a library, offices, and a 750 seat-capacity auditorium. On November 27, 1923, the new Central Union High School building was formally dedicated and opened to the public. In honor of the occasion, the school board secured an invitation to the State Superintendent of Public Instruction, Will C. Wood, to deliver a short address at the dedication ceremony

Facing the near capacity situation at the West Campus, as well as the increase in enrollment in the following years, the Central Unified School Board approved the construction of another high school campus. The campus was built on 60 acres on the northwest corner of Dakota Ave. and Cornelia Ave. The campus officially welcomed its students during the 1996–1997 school year. Much controversy came from which students would attend which campus or if students would be divided and attend both schools. Originally all freshmen students were required to attend West Campus while sophomore, junior, and senior students had the option to go to East Campus, or stay at West campus. However, with the steady increase in freshmen students every year, the district decided to let freshman choose to go to either West Campus or East Campus. However, freshman attending East Campus must enroll in one of four of the career academies on Campus. Enrollment in either of the academies requires a four-year commitment to East Campus.

Athletics
Central is part of the CIF Central Section and competes in the Tri-River-Athletic-Conference (TRAC) in all sports with Buchanan, Clovis High School, Clovis East, Clovis North and Clovis West.

Central has won 101 League Championships, 34 - North Sequoia League, 33 - Tri-River-Athletic-Conference, 27 - Central Sequoia League, 7 - Fresno County League

CIF Central Section Championships (31)
Boys Basketball (1993, 1996, 2016, 2017 & 2018), Pep & Cheer (2014, 2017, 2018**, 2020 & 2022), Football (2017, 2018 & 2019), Girls Golf (2014 & 2015), Track & Field (2008, 2017, & 2021), Softball (2012 & 2013), Baseball (1950 & 1964), Girls Tennis (1994), Boys Volleyball (2022) Girls Volleyball (2017), Boys Golf (2014), Boys Tennis (1992), Boys Soccer (2019 & 2020), Boys Cross Country (2019)

Pep & Cheer both teams won titles in 2018

CIF Regional Championships (4)
Girls Volleyball (2018 Northern California Regional - Open Division) & Football (2019 Northern California Regional Division I-AA), Cheer (NorCal) 2022, 2023 Girls Basketball (NorCal)

CIF State Championships (4)
2019 Football CIF State Division I-AA (15-0 Season), 2020 CIF Division III State Wrestling Dual Championship, 2022 Boys Track & Field, 2023 Girls Basketball

California State Championships Boys Track and Field 2021
Jeremiah Walker (2021) 400m

CIF Individual State Track & Field Champions
2022 - Boys 4x100, Jeremiah Walker 400 Meter Dash

Central Wrestling Individual Boys & Girls CIF State Champions
Adrian Camposano (2013) at 106 pounds & Paige Morales (2022) at 106 Pounds (36-0) Season Record

Unified Sports (Special needs program) along with the Clovis Unified Schools has won TRAC in Soccer 2016, 2018 & 2021

Pep & Cheer National Championships (7 USA & 1 NCA)
USA Cheer National Championships (2006, 2008, 2013, 2017 & 2020)
USA Pep National Championships (2007 & 2009)
NCA National Champions (2022)

Notable alumni
 Carter Hartwig, NFL player (class of 1975)
 Tom Goodwin, Minor League coach Atlanta Braves Organization (Class of 1986)
 Marcus Walden, baseball player, Relief Pitcher - Gastonia Honey Badgers (Class of 2006)
 Jaylon Johnson, NFL Player (Class of 2017), Cornerback - Chicago Bears
 Giana Mancha, (Class of 2017), Pitcher - University of Central Florida, 2022 5th pick overall of the Smash it sports Vipers of the Women's Professional Fastpitch

External links
Central Unified School District official website
Central High School Alumni Association

References

High schools in Fresno, California
Public high schools in California
1922 establishments in California